Leonard Vyse Harper (12 December 1880 – 13 January 1924) was an English first-class cricketer active 1900–04 who played for Surrey (awarded county cap 1904). He was born and died in Balham.

References

1880 births
1924 deaths
English cricketers
Surrey cricketers
Cambridge University cricketers
Gentlemen cricketers